The 1910 Detroit Heralds season was the sixth season of independent American football played by the Detroit Heralds. The team was coached by Bill Marshall and compiled a 3–0 record. 

The team's lineup included Birtie Maher (end), Polly La Grue (quarterback), Lawrence Nadeau (fullback), and Sylvester "Ole" Mauer (halfback).

Schedule

References 

Detroit Heralds seasons
Detroit Heralds